FC Meshakre Agara is a Georgian association football club.

Racha was promoted from Regionuli Liga in 2005. The club left Pirveli Liga in the end of 2007–08 season.

The club was merged with Akhalgazrda Sportsmenta Akademia Tbilisi in January 2005 as ASA-Meshakre Agara.

In Soviet times the club named as Mekanikosi Agara.

Seasons
{|class="wikitable"
|-bgcolor="#efefef"
! Season
! League
! Pos.
! Pl.
! W
! D
! L
! GF
! GA
! P
!Cup
!Notes
!    Manager
|-
|2005–06
|bgcolor=#ffa07a|2
|5
|34
|18
|5
|11
|46
|32
|59
|1st round
|
|
|-
|2006–07
|bgcolor=#ffa07a|2
|7
|34
|15
|10
|9
|45
|36
|55
|2nd round
|
|
|-
|2007–08
|bgcolor=#ffa07a|2 – West
| 4
| 27
| 13
| 9
| 5
| 34
| 22
| 48
|1st round
|
|
|-
|}

Meshakre Agara